Anania Shirakatsi (Anania Širakac’i, anglicized: Ananias of Shirak) was a 7th-century Armenian polymath and natural philosopher, author of extant works covering mathematics, astronomy, geography, chronology, and other fields. Little is known for certain of his life outside of his own writings, but he is considered the father of the exact and natural sciences in Armenia—the first Armenian mathematician, astronomer, and cosmographer.

Seen as a part of the Armenian Hellenizing School, the last lay scholar in Christian Armenia until the 11th century, Anania was educated primarily by Tychicus, in Trebizond. He composed science textbooks and the first known geographic work in classical Armenian (Ashkharhatsuyts), which provides detailed information about Greater Armenia, Persia and the Caucasus (Georgia and Caucasian Albania).

In mathematics, his accomplishments include the earliest known table of results of the four basic operations, the earliest known collection of recreational math puzzles and problems, and the earliest book of math problems in Armenian. He also devised a system of mathematical notation based on the Armenian alphabet, although he was the only writer known to have used it.

Name
His name is usually anglicized as Ananias of Shirak (Širak). Anania is the Armenian variant of the biblical name Ananias, itself the Greek version of the Hebrew Hananiah. The second part of his name denotes his place of origin, the region of Shirak (Širak), though it may have become a sort of surname. In some manuscripts, he is called Shirakuni (Շիրակունի) and Shirakavantsi (Շիրակաւանցի).

Life

Background
Anania Shirakatsi lived in the 7th century. The dates of his birth and death have not been definitively established. Robert H. Hewsen noted in 1968 that Anania is widely believed to have been born between 595 and 600; a quarter-century later he settled on c. 610 as a birthdate and 685 as the year he died. Agop Jack Hacikyan et al. place his birth in early 600s but agrees on 685. James R. Russell, Edward G. Mathews, and Theo van Lint also concur with 610–685, while Greenwood suggests c. 600–670. Vardanyan places his death in the early 690s.

Anania is the only classical Armenian scholar to have written an autobiography. It is a brief text, characterized as "somewhat self-congratulatory" and "more a statement of academic pedigree" than autobiography. It was probably written as the preface to one of his scholarly works, possibly the K'nnikon. He was the son of Hovhannes/Yovhannes and was born in the village of Anania/Aneank' (Անեանք) or in the town of Shirakavan (Yerazgavors), in the canton of Shirak (Širak), in the central Armenian province of Ayrarat. Aneank' may be connected to the later city of Ani, the Bagratid Armenian capital.

Anania probably came from a noble family. Since his name is sometimes spelled as "Shirakuni" (Շիրակունի), Hewsen argued that he may have belonged to the house of the Kamsarakan or Arsharuni princes of Shirak and Aršarunik’, respectively. Greenwood suggests that it is more likely that Anania came from the lesser nobility in Shirak, who served the house of Kamsarakan. Broutian describes his father as a "minor Armenian nobleman." Vardanyan believes he either came from the Kamsarakan family or that they were his patrons.

Anania is traditionally thought to have been buried in the village of Anavank', however, the tradition probably originated from the name of the village.

Education 
Anania received his early education at the local Armenian schools, possibly at Dprevank monastery, where he studied sacred texts and earlier Armenian authors. Due to the lack of teachers and books in Armenia, he decided to travel to the Byzantine Empire (the "land of the Greeks") to study mathematics. After first traveling to Theodosiopolis, then to the Byzantine-controlled province of Fourth Armenia (probably Martyropolis), where he studied under the mathematician Christosatur for six months. He then left to find a better teacher and learned about Tychicus, who was based at the monastery (or martyrium) of Saint Eugenios in Trebizond. Redgate placed this in the 620s. Greenwood has speculated that Tychicus, not mentioned elsewhere, may actually be Stephanus of Alexandria.

Anania devoted a significant part of his autobiography to Tychicus (born c. 560), with whom he spent eight years in the 620s or 630s. Tychicus had studied the Armenian language and its literature while serving in the Byzantine army in Armenia. Wounded by the Persians, he retired from the military and later studied in Alexandria, Rome, and Constantinople. Tychicus later returned to his native Trebizond, where he established a school c. 615. Tychicus taught many students from Constantinople (including from the imperial court) and was renowned among Byzantine kings. He provided Anania special attention and taught him what Anania called a "perfect knowledge of mathematics". In Tychicus's vast library, Anania found "everything, exoteric and esoteric", including sacred and secular Greek authors, including works on the sciences, medicine, chronology, and history. James R. Russell argued that his library may have included Pythagorean and alchemical books. Anania considered Tychicus to have been "predestined by God for the introduction of science into Armenia."

Educator and scientist
Anania himself established a school in Armenia upon his return. That school, the first in Armenia to teach quadrivium, is presumed to have been located in his native Shirak. He was disappointed with the laziness of his students and their departure after learning the basics. Anania complained about Armenians' lack of interest in mathematics, writing that they "love neither learning, nor knowledge." Nicholas Adontz considered it an exaggeration, "if not an absolute slander, to deny the Armenian innate love of investigation." The 12th-century chronicler Samuel of Ani listed five of Shirakatsi's students, who are otherwise unknown. Anania financed his research in several fields with the money he earned teaching.

Relationship with the Armenian Church
Anania had a close relationship with the Church. Several scholars consider him a church ideologist akin to Cosmas Indicopleustes, whom he actually criticized. Hacikyan et al. describe Anania as a "devout Christian and well versed in the Bible" who "made some attempts to reconcile science and Scripture." In his later years, Anania may have been a monk in the Armenian Church. This is based on his religious discourses and attempts to date the feasts of the church. John A. C. Greppin doubts that Anania was ever in any religious order.

Hewsen noted that some of Anania's "more revolutionary ideas" were suppressed by the Armenian Church after his death. Greppin noted that Anania, a largely secular author, had fallen into a "bad clerical odor." Soviet historians represented him as a founder of irreligious and anti-clerical thought in Armenia, who pioneered double-truth theory. Vazgen Chaloyan called him a "progressive representative of the feudal period of Armenian science." Gevorg Khrlopian went as far as to argue that Anania was an enemy of the Armenian Church and fought against its obscurantism. Hewsen opposed this view, suggesting that, instead, he was an "independent thinker of sorts."

Philosophy
Anania is considered by modern scholars to be a representative of the Hellenizing School since many of his works were based on classical Greek sources. He was the first Armenian scholar to have "imported a set of scientific notions, and examples of their applications, from the Greek-speaking schools" into Armenia. He was well versed in Greek literature, and the influence of Greek syntax is evident in his works. Anania was also knowledgeable about native Armenian and Iranian cultural traditions; several of his works provide important information on late Sassanian Iran.

James R. Russell describes him an alchemist and a Pythagorean who "does not usually rely on mythology to explain natural phenomena. Anania accepted the importance of experience, observation, rational practice and theory, and was influenced by the ideas of the 5th-century Neoplatonist philosopher Davit Anhaght (the Invincible), and Greek philosophers Thales of Miletus, Hippocrates, Democritus, Plato, Aristotle, Zeno of Citium, Epicurus, Ptolemy, Pappus of Alexandria, and Cosmas Indicopleustes. Aristotle's On the Heavens had a significant influence on Anania's thought. According to Gevorg Khrlopian, Anania was heavily influenced by Yeghishe's An Interpretation of Creation, the anonymous Interpretation of the Categories of Aristotle, and the works of Davit Anhaght, who had established Neoplatonism in Armenian thought. Anania was also the first Armenian scholar to quote Philo of Alexandria.

Anania was the last known lay scholar in Christian Armenia until Grigor Magistros Pahlavuni in the 11th century. He advocated rationalism in studying nature and attacked superstitious beliefs and astrology as the "babblings of the foolish." He adopted the classical theory of four elements, which considered all matter to be composed of four elements: fire, air, water, and earth. He believed that while God directly created these elements, He did not interfere with the "natural course of the development of things." He asserted that the creation, existence, and decay of natural bodies and phenomena occurred through the union of these elements—without the interference of God. Both living and non-living matter came into existence from a synthesis of the four elements.

Anania accepted that the Earth is round, describing it as "like an egg with a spherical yolk (the globe) surrounded by a layer of white (the atmosphere) and covered with a hard shell (the sky)." He accurately explained solar and lunar eclipses, the phases of the Moon, and the structure of the Milky Way, describing the latter as a "mass of dense but faintly luminous stars." Anania also correctly attributed tides to the influence of the Moon. He described the topmost sphere as the aether (arp'i), the source of light and heat (through the Sun).

Works
Anania was a polymath and natural philosopher. About 40 works in various disciplines have been attributed to Anania, but only half are extant. They include studies and translations in mathematics, astronomy, cosmology, geography, chronology, and meteorology. Many of his works are believed to have been part of the K'nnikon (Քննիկոն, from "canon", Greek: Kanonikon), completed circa 666, and used as the standard science textbook in medieval Armenia. According to Greenwood, the K'nnikon was a "fluid compilation, whose contents fluctuated over time, reflecting the interests and resources of different teachers and practitioners."

Modern scholars have praised Anania's writing as concise, simple, and to the point, retaining the reader's attention and citing examples to illustrate his point.

Mathematical

Anania was primarily devoted to mathematics, which he considered the "mother of all knowledge." His mathematical books were used as textbooks in Armenia.

Of Anania's several mathematical works, the most important is the book of arithmetic (Hamaroghut’iun, Համարողութիւն; or T'vabanut'iun, Թւաբանութիւն), a comprehensive collection of tables on the four basic operations. It is the earliest extant known work of its kind. The operations reach up to a total of 80 million, which is the highest number. A possible theoretical part is believed lost.

Problems and Solutions (alternatively translated as On Questions and Answers), a collection of 24 arithmetical problems and their solutions, is based on the application of fractions; it is the earliest such work in Armenian. Many of its problems allude to real-world situations: six connect to the princely house of Shirak, the Kamsarakans, and at least three to Iran. Greenwood calls the problems "a rich source for seventh-century history whose value has not been sufficiently recognized."

The third work, probably an appendix of the book of arithmetic, is titled Xraxc'anakank (Խրախճանականք), literally "things for festive occasions". It has been translated into English as Mathematical Pastimes, Fun with Arithmetic or Problems for Amusement. It also contains 24 problems "intended for mathematical entertainment in social gatherings." According to Mathews this may be the oldest extant text of its kind.

Numerical notation
For his mathematical works, Anania developed a unique numerical notation based on 12 letters of the Armenian alphabet. For the units, he used the first nine letters of the Armenian script (Ա, Բ, Գ, Դ, Ե, Զ, Է, Ը, Թ), similar to the standard traditional Armenian numerical system. The letters used for 10, 100, and 1000 were also identical to the traditional Armenian system (Ժ, Ճ, Ռ), but all other numbers up to 10,000 were written using these 12 letters. For instance, 50 would be written ԵԺ (5×10) and not Ծ as in the standard system. Thus, the notation is multiplicative-additive as opposed to the ciphered-additive standard system and requires knowing 12 letters, instead of 36, to write numbers less than 10,000. Numbers greater than that could be written using multiplicative combinations of just 2 or 3 signs, but using all 36 letters.

Stephen Chrisomalis believes this system was created by Anania since it only occurs in his works and is not found in Greek, Syriac, Hebrew, or any other alphabetic numeral system. Allen Shaw has argued it was just a variant of the Armenian numerals designed specifically for the representation of large numbers. No other writer used it.

Astronomical

One of Anania's most significant works is the Cosmology (Տիեզերագիտութիւն, Tiezeragitut’iun). Abrahamian's version is composed of ten chapters, with an introduction titled "In the Fulfillment of a Promise", implying a patron. It covers the sun, the moon, celestial spheres, constellations, the Milky Way, and meteorological changes.

Works used for the parts of the Cosmology include the Bible (mostly the Pentateuch and Psalms) and works by the Church Fathers. Anania cites the work of Basil of Caesarea, Gregory the Illuminator, and Amphiolocus (perhaps, of Iconium). Some chapters of the work, such as "On Clouds" (also called "On the Sky" or "Concerning the Skies"), are largely based on Basil's Hexameron. Anania also repeats the classical Greek notions in the fields of astronomy, physics or meteorology. Pambakian wrote about the significance of the Cosmology: 

Another of Anania's astronomical works, Tables of the Motions of the Moon (Խորանք ընթացիք լուսոյ, xorank‘ ĕnt'ac'ik' lusoy), is based on the works of Meton of Athens and his own observations.

Perpetual calendar
In 667 Anania was invited by Catholicos Anastas I of Akori (r. 661/2–667) to the Armenian Church's central seat at Dvin to establish a fixed calendar of the movable and immovable feasts of the Armenian Church. The result was a perpetual calendar based on a 532-year cycle (ՇԼԲ բոլորակ), combining the solar cycle and the lunar cycle since they coincide every 532 years. It was first proposed by Victorius of Aquitaine in 457 and adopted by the Church of Alexandria. Anania's calendar was never implemented by the Armenian Church; Hovhannes Draskhanakerttsi believes that Anastas's death prevented a church council from ratifying it.

Geographical

The Ashkharhatsuyts (classical Armenian: Աշխարհացոյց, Ašxarhac'oyts, lit. "showing the world") is an anonymously published world map, believed to have been written sometime between 610 and 636. According to Elizabeth Redgate, it was written "probably shortly before AD 636". Its authorship has been disputed in the modern period; formerly believed to have been the work of Movses Khorenatsi, most scholars now attribute it to Anania. Hewsen calls it "one of the most valuable works to come down to us from Armenian antiquity."

The Armenian Geography—as it is alternatively known—has been especially important for research into the history and geography of Greater Armenia, the Caucasus (Georgia and Caucasian Albania) and the Sasanian Empire, which are all described in detail. The territories are described before the Arab invasions and conquests. The information on Armenia is not found elsewhere in historical sources, as it is the only known Armenian geographical work prior to the 13th century.

The Ashkharhatsuyts has survived in long and short recensions. According to the scholarly consensus, the long recension was the original. For the description of Europe, North Africa and Asia (all the known world from Spain to China), it largely uses Greek sources, namely the now lost geography of Pappus of Alexandria (4th century), which in turn, is based on the Geography of Ptolemy (2nd century). According to Hewsen, it is the "last work based on ancient geographical knowledge written before the Renaissance."

It was one of the earliest secular Armenian works to be published (in 1668 by Voskan Yerevantsi). It has been translated into four languages: English, Latin (both 1736), French (1819), and Russian (1877). In 1877, Kerovbe Patkanian first attributed it to Anania as the most probable author.

Another geographical work of Anania, The Itinerary (Մղոնաչափք, Mghonachap'k’ or Młonača'k’), may have been a part of the Ashkharhatsuyts.

Chronology
Anania's major chronological work, the Chronicle, listed important events in order of their occurrence. Written between 686 and 690, it is composed of two parts: a universal chronicle, utilizing the lost works of Annianus of Alexandria and the lost Roman imperial sequence from Eusebius's Chronographia, and an ecclesiastical history from a miaphysite perspective, which records the six ecumenical councils.

Another chronological work, known as the Calendar (Tomar), included texts and tables about the calendars of 15 peoples: Armenians, Hebrews, Arabs, Macedonians, Romans, Syrians, Greeks, Egyptians, Ethiopians, Athenians, Bythanians, Cappadocians, Georgians, Caucasian Albanians, and Persians. The calendars of the Armenians, Romans, Hebrews, Syrians, Greeks, and Egyptians contain texts, while those of other peoples only have the names of months and their length.

Other
Anania wrote several books on weights and measures. He extensively used the work of Epiphanius of Salamis to present the system of weights used by the Greeks, Jews, and Syrians, and his own knowledge as well as other sources for those of the Armenians and Persians. 

Anania wrote several works on precious stones, music, and the known languages of the world. 

Anania's discourses on Christmas/Epiphany and Easter are discussions on the dates of the two feasts. In the first, he uses a lost work he ascribes to Polycarp of Smyrna and insists that the Armenian custom of celebrating Christmas and the Epiphany on the same date is truer to the holidays' intent than celebrating them separately as is common elsewhere in the Christian world.

Traditions and legends 
Anania also wrote on herbal medicine, though none of his medical writings have survived. He is traditionally credited with the discovery of the miraculous flower called hamasp’iwr or hamaspiur (համասփիւռ). One 16th century manuscript mentions that he dealt with its therapeutic properties. It has been identified by modern scholars as Silene latifolia (white campion). He discovered the plant in Dzoghakert (near modern Taşburun, Iğdır, Turkey) and used it medically.

According to a later legend, he taught alchemy to the king of Venice.

Legacy

Influence in the Middle Ages
Anania laid the foundations of the exact sciences in Armenia and greatly influenced many Armenian scholars who came after him. Hovhannes Imastaser (Hovhannes Sarkavag) and other medieval scholars extensively cited and incorporated Anania's works. In a 1037 letter, Grigor Magistros, a scholar from the Pahlavuni noble family, asked Catholicos Petros Getadardz for Anania's manuscripts of his K’nnikon, which were locked up at the catholicosate for centuries. Grigor used these as a textbook at his school at the Sanahin Monastery. Anania may had also influenced Byzantine Armenian scholars, such as the 9th century philosopher Leo and the 14th century mathematician and grammarian .

Reemergence in the modern period

In the printed age, passing references to Anania were made as early as 1742 by Paghtasar Dpir, but it was not until the latter half of the 19th century that Anania and his work became a subject of scholarly study. In 1877 Armenian linguist and philologist Kerovbe Patkanian published a collection of Anania's works in the original classical Armenian at St Petersburg University. Titled Sundry Studies (Մնացորդք բանից, Mnatsordk’ banits), it is the first-ever print publication of his works. Galust Ter-Mkrtchian published a number of Anania's works in 1896. Joseph Orbeli, an Armenian member of the Russian Academy of Sciences, published a Russian translation of Anania's Problems and Solutions in 1918.

Systematic study and publication of his works began in the Soviet period. Ashot G. Abrahamian, who began his research at the Matenadaran in the 1930s, first published one of Anania's arithmetical texts in 1939, followed by a complete compilation of Anania's work in 1944.

Abrahamian's work was not received with universal acclaim. One critic objected to his 1944 compilation for attributing disputed works to Anania. Abrahamian and Garegin Petrosian published an updated edition in 1979. Some criticism persisted: Varag Arakelian noted a number of errors in translations from classical Armenian and concluded that a new translation of Anania's works was needed. Another Soviet scholar, Suren T. Eremian, studied the Geography. He insisted on Anania's authorship and published his research in 1963.

The first translation of Anania's work into a European language was done by the British Orientalist Frederick Cornwallis Conybeare, who translated into English Anania's On Christmas, in 1896, and On Easter and Anania's autobiography, in 1897. Lemerle noted that Conybeare translated Anania's autobiography from a Russian translation, and it contains numerous serious errors. Renewed interest in Anania's work emerged in the West in the 1960s. A French translation of his autobiography appeared in 1964 by Haïg Berbérian. Robert H. Hewsen authored an introductory article on Anania's life and scholarship in 1968.

Greenwood argues that studying Anania and his works "resonated with twentieth-century political beliefs and offered a suitable subject for academic research in ways that works on medieval theology or Biblical exegesis did not. Anania came to be projected as a national hero from the distant Armenian past, linking and affirming past and present identities."

Modern assessment 
Anania is considered by modern scholars as the "father of the exact sciences in Armenia." Modern historians consider him as the greatest scientist of medieval Armenia and, possibly, all Armenian history, up to the 20th century astrophysicist Viktor Ambartsumian. He is widely regarded as the founder of the natural sciences in the country. He was the first classical Armenian scholar to study mathematics and several scientific subjects, such as cosmography and chronology. Nicholas Adontz argued that Anania "occupied the same position in Armenian education as Leo [the Mathematician] did in Byzantine education. He was the first to sow the seeds of science among the Armenians." Hacikyan et al. wrote in The Heritage of Armenian Literature:

Shirakatsi was one of six scholars whose statue was erected in front of the Matenadaran, the museum-institute of Armenian manuscripts in Yerevan, in the 1960s. Another statue was erected in the front yard of the Yerevan State University. A crater on the Moon was named after Shirakatsi in 1979.

In independent post-Soviet Armenia, Anania Shirakatsi has been commemorated in various ways. In 1993 the Medal of Anania Shirakatsi, a state award, was established, given for "significant activities, inventions, and discoveries in the spheres of economy, engineering, architecture, science, and technology." In 2005 the Central Bank of Armenia issued a commemorative coin, while HayPost issued a stamp dedicated to Anania Shirakatsi.

References
Notes

Citations 

Bibliography

Books on Anania

 online

 PDF (archived)

General books

Book chapters on Anania

Encyclopedia articles
 online

Journal articles

; originally published in Revue des Études Arméniennes'' 21, 1988-89, pp. 159-170

Further reading

External links

7th-century Armenian historians
7th-century mathematicians
7th-century astronomers
Armenian cartographers
Armenian mathematicians
Armenian astronomers
Medieval geographers
Medieval cartographers
Anania
7th-century Armenian writers
Armenian people from the Sasanian Empire
Cartographers
7th-century cartographers